Javier Hermida (born 8 April 1968) is a Spanish sailor. He competed in the Star event at the 1996 Summer Olympics.

References

External links
 

1968 births
Living people
Spanish male sailors (sport)
Olympic sailors of Spain
Sailors at the 1996 Summer Olympics – Star
Place of birth missing (living people)
Sportspeople from Ferrol, Spain
Sportspeople from Galicia (Spain)